Alan Holman may refer to:

 Alan M. Holman (1904–1994), American football player and coach of football and basketball
 J. Alan Holman (1931–2006), American paleontologist and herpetologist